U.S. Route 45E (US 45E)  is a  state highway in West Tennessee, connecting Jackson with South Fulton via Milan and Martin. For the majority of its length, it runs concurrently with unsigned State Route 43 (SR 43) for most of that highway’s length except for short segments at Martin and South Fulton, where it is cosigned with SR 216 and SR 215, respectively.

Route description

US 45E begins in Madison County, running concurrently with unsigned SR 43 and SR 186 in Three Way at an interchange between US 45 and US 45W (SR 5). It goes northeast as a four-lane divided highway, where SR 186 splits off, before crossing into Gibson County. US 45E/SR 43 immediately enters Medina, where the highway bypasses downtown on the western side and has an intersection with SR 152. It then leaves Medina and continues north to enter Milan and has an intersection with SR 187 before becoming an undivided four-lane highway as it passes through residential areas. US 45E/SR 43 then enters downtown and runs concurrently with SR 104. The highway then has an intersection with US 70A/US 79/SR 76/SR 77, where SR 77 joins the concurrency, before continuing north through downtown to an intersection with Front Street, where SR 77 and SR 104 split off to the west. US 45E/SR 43 continues north through residential areas to have an intersection with SR 425 before leaving Milan and continuing north through rural areas, where it becomes a divided highway again. US 45E/SR 43 crosses a bridge over the Rutherford Fork of the Obion River before passing through Idlewild and Bradford, where it bypasses downtown to the west, runs concurrently with SR 54 and has an intersection with SR 105. The highway then crosses the South Fork of the Obion River to enter Weakley County.

US 45E/SR 43/SR 54 then becomes an undivided highway again and enters Greenfield, where it goes straight through downtown, having an intersection with SR 124 and SR 54 splitting off and going east along Broad Street. US 45E/SR 43 the leaves town and has an intersection with SR 445 before leaving Greenfield. The highway continues north through rural areas, becoming a divided highway again to cross the Middle Fork of the Obion River, before passing through Sharon, which it bypasses completely along its west side and has an interchange with SR 89. US 45E/SR 43 then enters Martin and comes to an interchange with SR 216. Here, US 45E Bus./SR 372 begins and takes over the original route of US 45E/SR 43 through the city, US 45E turns east to become concurrent with SR 216, and SR 43 becomes signed as a primary highway and turns west along SR 216 and Skyhawk Parkway. US 45E/SR 216 heads east as a four-lane freeway along the south side of the city to have an interchange with Pair Road before coming to a very large interchange with SR 22 and SR 431, where SR 216 ends and SR 22 becomes concurrent with US 45E. The highway turns north to follow the eastern and northern edges of the city, where it has an interchange with Industrial Park Drive, before coming to another interchange with US 45E Business/SR 372 (N Lindell Street), where US 45E Bus. ends and US 45E splits from SR 22 and follows SR 372 north. The highway heads north through residential areas as a four-lane undivided highway before coming to another intersection with SR 43 (Skyhawk Parkway), where SR 372 ends and US 45E joins SR 43 again to leave Martin as a divided highway.

The highway crosses the North Fork of the Obion River into Obion County, where it passes through farmland, and has an intersection with SR 190, before entering South Fulton and becoming undivided to arrive at an intersection with unsigned SR 215. Here SR 43 splits off, and becomes signed again, along Broadway Street while US 45E bypasses downtown along the south and west sides running concurrently with SR 215. US 45E then comes to an end at an interchange between US 51, US 45W, US 45, and unsigned SR 3, just feet from the Kentucky state line.

Major intersections

Martin business route

U.S. Route 45E Business (US 45E Bus.) is a  business route of US 45E that travels along that highway’s former alignment through downtown Martin, Tennessee. It runs concurrently with unsigned State Route 372 (SR 372) for its entire length.

The highway begins as Elm Street at an interchange between US 45E, SR 43, and SR 216. It heads north through rural areas as a two-lane highway for a little over a mile before passing through a business district and some neighborhoods. US 45E Bus. then enters downtown and becomes concurrent with SR 431 as they pass along University Street and S Lindell Street as a four-lane undivided highway. SR 431 now splits off along Main Street and US 45 Bus. narrows to two lanes and continues north to leave downtown and pass through a business district. It passes through some neighborhoods before coming to an end at an interchange with SR 22 and US 45E, with unsigned SR 372 continuing north along N Lindell Street and US 45E.

State Route 372

It serves as the unsigned companion route of US 45E Business, as well as for US 45E between the SR 22 interchange and the SR 43 junction on the north side of the city.

References

E
45E
45E
Transportation in Madison County, Tennessee
Transportation in Gibson County, Tennessee
Transportation in Weakley County, Tennessee
Transportation in Obion County, Tennessee
Freeways in Tennessee